Brian Max Schwenke Jr. (born March 22, 1991) is a former American football player. He played college football at California and was drafted by the Tennessee Titans in the fourth round of the 2013 NFL Draft.

Early years
Schwenke was born in Waukegan, Illinois and is of Samoan descent. Due to his father’s job in the Navy, he grew up in Hawaii and later San Diego. Schwenke attended Oceanside High School, where he played for the Oceanside Pirates high school football team. Schwenke was teammates with lineman Larry Warford, who attended Oceanside during his freshman, and sophomore year, Sam Brenner offensive lineman and with quarterback Jordan Wynn. Regarded as a three-star recruit by Rivals.com, Schwenke was rated as the No. 44 offensive guard prospect in his class.

College career
While attending the University of California, Berkeley, Schwenke played for the California Golden Bears football team from 2009 to 2012.  He played in 48 of 50 possible games during his four seasons with the program, starting 36 of 37 games over his final three seasons.  He started his career at guard, making 16 starts at left guard and then eight at right guard, before being moved to center during his senior year.  He started 12 games and earned first-team All-Pac-12 Conference honors.

Professional career

Tennessee Titans
The Tennessee Titans chose Schwenke in the fourth round, with the 107th overall pick, of the 2013 NFL Draft. In four years as a member of the Titans, Schwenke played in 41 games and started 28 of them.

Indianapolis Colts
On March 13, 2017, Schwenke signed with the Indianapolis Colts. He was released by the Colts on September 3, 2017.

Tennessee Titans (second stint)
On September 4, 2017, Schwenke re-signed with the Titans. He played in all 16 games, starting two at left guard in place of an injured Quinton Spain.

New England Patriots
On July 31, 2018, Schwenke signed with the New England Patriots. He was released on September 1, 2018, but was re-signed three days later. He took snaps in three games, but did not start any of them; he was placed on injured reserve on November 6, 2018, with a foot injury. The Patriots reached Super Bowl LIII where they defeated the Los Angeles Rams 13-3, earning Schwenke a Super Bowl ring.

On February 13, 2019, Schwenke signed a one-year contract extension with the Patriots. On July 24, 2019, the Patriots placed Schwenke on the reserve/retired list.

References

External links

Tennessee Titans bio*
California Golden Bears football bio

1991 births
Living people
American football offensive linemen
American sportspeople of Samoan descent
California Golden Bears football players
Indianapolis Colts players
New England Patriots players
Sportspeople from Waukegan, Illinois
Players of American football from Illinois
Players of American football from California
Players of American football from Hawaii
Sportspeople from Oceanside, California
Tennessee Titans players